North Ballston Spa is a census-designated place (CDP) within the town of Milton in Saratoga County, New York, United States. As of the 2010 census, it had a population of 1,338.

The CDP is southwest of the center of Saratoga County, in the southeastern corner of the town of Milton. It is bordered to the south by the village of Ballston Spa, the Saratoga county seat; to the north by the Milton CDP; and to the east by the city of Saratoga Springs, the largest city in the county.

New York State Route 50 runs through North Ballston Spa, connecting Ballston Spa and Saratoga Springs.

Demographics

References 

Census-designated places in Saratoga County, New York
Census-designated places in New York (state)